Achilles Heel (also known as Pedro the Lion's Achilles Heel) is the fourth album by indie rock band Pedro the Lion. It was released on May 25, 2004, on Jade Tree Records. The cover artwork was by Jesse LeDoux. It reached #26 on the Top Heatseekers and #24 on the Top Independent Albums charts.

Track listing
All tracks by David Bazan except "Keep Swinging" (co-written with T.W. Walsh) and "Start Without Me" (T.W. Walsh).
 "Bands With Managers"  – 3:46
 "Foregone Conclusions"  – 2:27
 "The Fleecing"  – 4:41
 "Discretion"  – 2:50
 "Arizona"  – 4:08
 "Keep Swinging"  – 2:53
 "Transcontinental"  – 2:38
 "I Do"  – 4:11
 "A Simple Plan"  – 3:41
 "Start Without Me"  – 3:11
 "The Poison"  – 3:46

Personnel
 David Bazan — vocals, guitar, drums, synthesizer, bass and percussion
 T.W. Walsh — bass, drums, synthesizer and guitar
 James McAlister — percussion, drums and synthesizer
 Casey Foubert — guitar on "Keep Swinging"
 David Bazan, T.W. Walsh — engineering
 Chris Colbert — mixing
 Jesse LeDoux — cover art

References

Pedro the Lion albums
2004 albums
Jade Tree (record label) albums